George Herzog (October 19, 1851 – September 16, 1920) was an American interior designer and decorative painter, best known for his work on Philadelphia Masonic Temple.

Career

Born in Munich to German landscape painter Hermann Ottomar Herzog, he trained under the ornamental painter Joseph Schwarzmann, and at Munich's Royal Academy of Arts. His family immigrated to the United States in 1871. He became a partner in the Philadelphia decorating firm of Otto & Konstantine Kaiser in 1873, and assumed management of the firm in 1874, following the Kaisers' deaths. His work received prizes at the 1876 Centennial Exposition for upholstery design and fresco painting.

He specialized in ceiling and wall decoration, and sometimes oil portraiture. The goddesses playing musical instruments in the music room ceiling mural of Albert H. Disston's house may be portraits of the client's relatives. The wall murals in the dining room of industrialist Peter A. B. Widener's house featured portraits of the client's children in Renaissance garb looking down from a balcony. Herzog's ornate interiors often combined stencilled geometric patterns with painted floral and classical-inspired scenes:
Herzog's interiors—commonly consisting of wall as well as ceiling treatments—mixed meticulous German training with late-Victorian American tastes. Their closest analog is the oeurvre of the Herter Brothers, European-trained partners who designed interiors for New York's elite. Like the Herter Brothers, Herzog frequently exercised control over the entire interior design process, including walls, ceilings, furniture, draperies and glass.

He decorated major rooms at Philadelphia City Hall, including the Mayor's Reception Room, the Supreme Court Room, the Judges' Consultation Room and the Law Library. He was a member of the Philadelphia Masonic Temple and the Union League of Philadelphia, and completed multiple commissions for each. He decorated the city and country houses of industrialists, churches, and Keneseth Israel, the largest synagogue in Philadelphia. He did work at Shelby County Courthouse in Memphis, Tennessee. He opened an office in New York City, and decorated interiors there and on Long Island, including the Harmonie Club with McKim, Mead & White.

Louis Comfort Tiffany formed Associated American Artists in 1879, assembling a team of artisans to create a comprehensive (if short-lived) design company. Perhaps in imitation, a team of Philadelphia artisans – Herzog (decorative painting and textiles), Charles F. Vollmer (furniture and cabinetry), Alfred Godwin (stained glass), J. E. McClees (art and imported goods),  Sharpless & Watt (decorative tiles and metalwork) – joined in 1893 to form Associated Art Workers. They opened a designer showcase house at 1518 Chestnut Street, Philadelphia, but the company appears to have disbanded by 1895.

Most of Herzog's work does not survive, it was demolished, destroyed or painted over. His most-intact interiors are at the Philadelphia Masonic Temple, where he designed roughly 80% of the decorative painting. Collections of his watercolor renderings are at the Athenaeum of Philadelphia, Philadelphia Masonic Temple, and the Carnegie Museum of Art in Pittsburgh, Pennsylvania.

Selected projects

Philadelphia

 Albert H. Disston house, 1530 North 16th Street, Philadelphia, Edwin Forrest Durang, architect (1881–82).
 Saint James Roman Catholic Church, 38th & Chestnut Streets, Philadelphia, Edwin Forrest Durang, architect (1881–87). Now St. Agatha–St. James Roman Catholic Church.
 Union League of Philadelphia, 140 South Broad Street, John Fraser, architect. Library ceiling, restaurant ceiling, banquet room, other work (1881–89).
 Reuben O. Moon house, 1516 North 16th Street, Philadelphia (1884).
 Peter A. B. Widener house, Broad Street & Girard Avenue, Philadelphia, Willis G. Hale, architect (1887, demolished 1980).
 Young Maennerchor Society Hall, 6th & Vine Streets, Philadelphia, Paul Bonner, architect (1889, demolished).
 Philadelphia City Hall, John McArthur, Jr., architect. Mayor's Reception Room ceiling, Supreme Court Room, Judges' Consultation Room, Law Library, other work (1889–91).
 Philadelphia Masonic Temple, Broad Street, Philadelphia, James H. Windrim, architect. Egyptian Hall, Ionic Hall, Norman Hall, Corinthian Hall, Library and Museum, other work (1889–1903).
 William Kemble house (Kemble-Bergdoll mansion), 2201-05 Green Street, Philadelphia, James H. Windrim, architect (1890).
 William Lukens Elkins house, 1218 North Broad Street, Philadelphia, William Powell, architect (1890, demolished).
 Keneseth Israel Temple, 1717 North Broad Street, Philadelphia, Oscar Frotscher & Louis Caron Hickman, architects (1891–92, demolished).
 Bank of North America, 305-07 Chestnut Street, Philadelphia, James H. & John T. Windrim, architects (1893–95, demolished 1972).
 Girard College, Philadelphia, unidentified commission (pre-1901).

Elsewhere
 Liederkranz Society, 111-19 East 58th Street, New York City, Hermann Schwarzmann, architect (1886, demolished 1964).
 "Beaumont" (William L. Austin mansion), 601 Ithan Avenue, Bryn Mawr, Pennsylvania, Baily & Truscott, architects (1901). Now Beaumont at Bryn Mawr retirement community.
 Shelby County Courthouse, Adams Avenue, Memphis, Tennessee, James Gamble Rogers, architect (1905–10).
 Harmonie Club, 4 East 60th Street, New York City, McKim, Mead & White, architects (1906).

References

1891 Profile of George Herzog in Philadelphia and Popular Philadelphians
Mark C. Luellen, The Decorative Work of George Herzog, 1851-1920, masters thesis, University of Pennsylvania, 1992.
Laura L. Libert, curator, Philadelphia Masonic Temple, "George Herzog, 1851-1920," Treasures of the Temple

External links

1851 births
1920 deaths
American interior designers
German emigrants to the United States
Artists from Philadelphia
Upholsterers